The puncheon was a British unit for beer, wines and spirits. It was also an American unit of capacity for wine.

Definition 

US unit of capacity for wine 

Conversion 

1 puncheon = 70-120 gallons
1 puncheon = 0.318-0.546 m3 or 318 to 546 litres.

US unit of capacity for wine 

1 puncheon = 4/3 Hogshead
1 puncheon = 84 gallons
1 puncheon = 0.317974589856 m3 or about 318 litres.

See also
English wine cask units

References

Units of volume
Customary units of measurement
Wine terminology